Ergasteria was an inland town of ancient Mysia on the road from Pergamum to Cyzicus, 440 stadia from Pergamum. It was noted by Galen as near a source of a metallic substance he called molybdaena. It was also known for silver mining in antiquity.

Its site is located near Balya Maden in Asiatic Turkey.

References

Populated places in ancient Mysia
Former populated places in Turkey